Secret Games 2: The Escort is a 1993 American erotic thriller film directed by Gregory Dark. The film stars Martin Hewitt, Marie Leroux, Amy Rochelle, Sara Suzanne Brown, Holly Spencer, and Jennifer Peace. Despite its title and also being directed by Dark and starring Hewitt, the film has no relation with Secret Games (1992).

Plot
A married artist enters the world of intrigue and sexual exploration with a prostitute.

Cast
 Martin Hewitt as Kyle Lake
 Marie Leroux as Heather Lake
 Amy Rochelle as Stacey
 Sara Suzanne Brown as Irene
 Holly Spencer as Lisa
 Jennifer Peace as Darci
 Thomas Milan as Hector
 Sherry Patterson as Lawyer
 Gregg Christie as Policeman
 Bill Williams as Policeman
 Mark Paladini as Bill

Release
The film was released in Germany as Secret Games: Verbotene Reize ("Secret Games: Forbidden Charms").

References

External links
 
 

1992 films
1990s erotic thriller films
American erotic thriller films
1992 drama films
1990s English-language films
1990s American films
Films directed by Gregory Dark